Charles Dédéyan (4 April 1910 – 21 June 2003) was a French-Armenian Romance philologist, literature comparatist and specialist of French literature.

Biography 
Dédéyan defended his thesis at the Sorbonne (Montaigne dans le Romantisme anglo-saxon et ses prolongements victoriens, esquisse d'une histoire de sa fortune de 1760 à 1900). From 1942 he was a lecturer at the University of Rennes and from 1945 to 1949 professor at the University of Lyon. From 1949 he held the chair of Comparative Literatures at the Sorbonne.

Dédéyan won several prizes awarded by the Académie Française, including the Prix Broquette-Gonin (1962), the Prix du  de la langue et de la littérature françaises (1967) and the Prix Gustave Le Métais-Larivière (1984). He was also an officier of the Légion d'honneur.

He is the father of historian Gérard Dédéyan.

Works

Bibliography 
 De Shakespeare à Michel Butor. Mélanges offerts à Monsieur Charles Dédéyan, Paris 1985
 International perspectives in comparative literature. Essays in honor of Charles Dédéyan, sous la direction de Virginia M. Shaddy, Lewiston 1991
 Hommage à Charles Dédéyan, in: Revue de littérature comparée 336, 2010
 Qui est qui. XXe siècle, Levallois-Perret 2005 s.v.

References

External links 
 Charles Dédéyan on Who's Who
 Fiche on Data.bnf.fr
 Le cosmopolitisme littéraire de Charles Dédéyan on Cairn info
 Charles Dédéyan on the site of the Académie Française

French people of Armenian descent
Armenians from the Ottoman Empire
Romance philologists
Academic staff of the University of Paris
Winners of the Prix Broquette-Gonin (literature)
Chevaliers of the Légion d'honneur
1910 births
People from İzmir
2003 deaths
Smyrniote Armenians